Libaas, literally meaning clothing, is a 1988 Hindi drama film, written and directed by Gulzar. The film based on the short story Seema, published in collected stories in Raavi Paar. It is about married couples of urban India having extramarital relations and adultery. The film won critical acclaim in international film festivals, but has not been released in India to date.

There had been only two public screening of Libaas in India, at the 23rd and 45th International Film Festival of India, in 1992 and 2014 respectively.

Cast
Shabana Azmi
Naseeruddin Shah
Raj Babbar
Sushma Seth
Utpal Dutt
Annu Kapoor

Synopsis
The story is based on Seema, a short story penned by Gulzar. Seema was married to a theatre artiste named Sudhir. Sudhir was a humorless workaholic, and Seema felt ignored and dissatisfied. She fell in love with Sudhir's vivacious friend T.K., and left her husband to marry him. However, she had lingering feelings for Sudhir. One day, Seema learns that Sudhir is unwell and impulsively visits her old home. The story ends when Seema hears a lady's laughter with Sudhir and quietly leaves.

Soundtrack
The music was by R. D. Burman, with lyrics by Gulzar.

References

External links

Films scored by R. D. Burman
1980s Hindi-language films
1988 films
Films about adultery in India
Censorship in India
Unreleased Hindi-language films
Films directed by Gulzar